Userkare (also Woserkare, meaning "Powerful is the soul of Ra") was the second pharaoh of the Sixth Dynasty, reigning briefly, 1 to 5 years, in the late 24th to early 23rd century BC. Userkare's relation to his predecessor Teti and successor Pepi I is unknown and his reign remains enigmatic. Although he is attested in historical sources, Userkare is completely absent from the tomb of the Egyptian officials who lived during his reign. In addition, the Egyptian priest Manetho reports that Userkare's predecessor Teti was murdered. Userkare is often considered to have been a short-lived usurper. Alternatively, he may have been a regent who ruled during Teti's son's childhood who later ascended the throne as Pepi I.

Attestations

Historical sources
Userkare is present on the Abydos King List, a list of kings written during the reign of Seti I (1290–1279 BC) over 1000 years after the early Sixth Dynasty. Userkare's cartouche occupies the 35th entry of the list, between those of Teti and Pepi I, making him the second pharaoh of the dynasty. Userkare was possibly also listed on the Turin canon, a king list composed during the reign of Ramesses II (1279–1213 BC). Unfortunately, a large lacuna affects the second line of the fourth column of the papyrus on which the list was written, the place were Userkare's name might have been located.

Contemporaneous sources
Secure attestations
Few artefacts dating to Userkare's lifetime have survived to this day, the only secure attestions contemporaneous with his reign being two cylinder seals inscribed with his name and titles and a copper mallet from the Michaelides collection. The mallet bears a small inscription giving the name of a crew of workmen "Beloved ones of Userkare" who hailed from Wadjet, the 10th nome of Upper Egypt, located around Tjebu, south of Asyut.

Possible attestations
The French Egyptologists Michel Baud and Vassil Dobrev have also proposed that a copper axe head discovered in Syria could belong to Userkare. The axe bears the name of another crew of workmen called the "Beloved ones of the Two Golden Falcons", where "Two Golden Falcons" is the golden Horus name of a pharaoh. Although both Khufu and Sahure bore this name and either one of them may be the owner of the axe, Baud and Dobrev note that Teti's and Pepi's golden horus names are "Golden Falcon who Unites" and "Three Golden Falcons", respectively. It is thus tempting to conclude that Userkare's was "Two Golden Falcons" and that the axe belongs to him.

The English Egyptologist Flinders Petrie has tentatively identified Userkare with a king named Ity attested by a single rock inscription found in the Wadi Hammamat. The inscription, dated to the first year of reign of Ity, mentions a band of 200 sailors and 200 masons under the direction of the overseers Ihyemsaf and Irenakhet sent to the Wadi Hammamat to collect stones for the construction of Ity's pyramid called "Bau Ity", meaning "Glory of Ity". Petrie's identification of Userkare with Ity relies solely on his estimation of the inscription to the Sixth Dynasty and the fact that Userkare is the only king of this period whose full titulary is not known. This identification is nowadays deemed conjectural and several First Intermediate Period dates have been proposed for Ity.

South Saqqara Stone
In addition to historical and contemporaneous sources, details about Userkare's reign were once given on the nearly contemporaneous South Saqqara Stone, a royal annal of the Sixth Dynasty dating to the reign of Merenre Nemtyemsaf I or Pepi II. Unfortunately, an estimated 92% of the original text was lost when the stone was roughly polished to be reused as a sarcophagus lid, possibly in the late First Intermediate (c. 2160–2055 BC) to early Middle Kingdom period (c. 2055–1650 BC). The presence of Userkare on the annal can nonetheless be inferred from a large space between the sections concerning the reigns of Teti and Pepi I as well as from traces of a royal titulary in this space. Although the text reporting Userkare's activities is lost, its length suggests that Userkare ruled Egypt for four or less likely two years.

Reign
Given the scarcity of documents pertaining to Userkare, his relations to his predecessor and successor are largely uncertain and Egyptologists have proposed a number of hypotheses regarding his identity and reign. These fall broadly into two contradictory scenarios: one that sees Userkare as a legitimate ruler or regent, while the other perceives Userkare as an usurper, possibly responsible for the murder of his predecessor Teti.

As a legitimate ruler
The Egyptologists William Stevenson Smith, William C. Hayes and Nicolas Grimal believe that Userkare briefly ruled Egypt either as a legitimate stopgap ruler or as a regent with queen Iput I. Indeed, Teti's son Pepi I reigned for circa 50 years, indicating that he was likely very young at the death of his father, likely too young to immediately assume the throne. The theory that Userkare was merely a regent is rejected by many Egyptologists, including Naguib Kanawati, on the basis that Userkare is mentioned on the Turin and Abydos king lists and hold full royal titulary, something reserved exclusively to reigning pharaohs.

In support of the hypothesis that Userkare was a legitimate stopgap ruler, Grimal stresses that he is well attested by historical and contemporaneous sources, in particular the Saqqara Stone. This seems in contradiction with the idea that, being illegitimate, he was victim of a Damnatio memoriae by his successor Pepi. In addition, there is no direct evidence of difficulties associated with Pepi I's rise on throne in the archeological record, which one could expect had Userkare been a usurper.

As a usurper to the throne
The Egyptian priest Manetho who wrote a history of Egypt, the Aegyptiaca, in the 3rd century BC during the reign of Ptolemy II (283–246 BC), mentions that Othoes –the hellenized name of Teti– was murdered by his bodyguards or attendants. Based on this statement, Egyptologists have found it plausible that Userkare participated in or at least benefited from Teti's assassination, despite Userkare's absence from the Aegyptiaca. Userkare's name is theophoric and incorporates the name of the sun god Ra, a naming fashion common during the preceding Fifth Dynasty. Since Teti was not a son of the last Fifth Dynasty king Unas, some Egyptologists have proposed that Userkare could have been a descendant of a lateral branch of the Fifth Dynasty royal family who briefly seized power in a coup.

The Egyptian-Australian Egyptologist Naguib Kanawati also finds the hypothesis that Userkare was a short-lived legitimate ruler or regent "unconvincing". Indeed, archeological evidence lends credence to the idea that Userkare was illegitimate in the eyes of his successor Pepi I. In particular, there is no mention of Userkare in the tombs and biographies of the many Egyptian officials who served under both Teti and Pepi I. The viziers Inumin and Khentika, who served both Teti and Pepi I, are completely silent about Userkare and none of their activities during Userkare's time on the throne are reported in their tomb. Furthermore, the tomb of Mehi, a guard who lived under Teti, Userkare and Pepi, yielded an inscription showing that the name of Teti was first erased to be replaced by that of another king, whose name was itself erased and replaced again by that of Teti. Kanawati argues that the intervening name was that of Userkare to whom Mehi may have transferred his allegiance. Mehi's attempt to switch back to Teti was seemingly unsuccessful, as there is evidence that work on his tomb stopped abruptly and that he was never buried there.

Tomb
The location of the tomb of Userkare has not yet been identified. The brevity of his reign implies that the tomb was probably unfinished at his death, making modern identification difficult. Since Userkare was a Sixth Dynasty pharaoh, his tomb was presumably  planned to be a pyramid. A possible vindication of this hypothesis is the copper mallet mentioning a team of paid workers from the nome of Wadjet. These workers were likely involved in an important building project, likely to be Userkare's pyramid.

Two hypotheses for the location of Userkare's pyramid have been put forth. The Egyptologist Vassil Dobrev proposed that Userkare's pyramid is located in the area of Saqqara South known today as Tabbet al-Guesh, north-west of the mortuary complex of Pepi I. Indeed, a large necropolis of Sixth Dynasty administration officials is found there, which according to Dobrev, hints at the nearby presence of a royal pyramid. The astrophysicist Giulio Magli believes instead that the pyramid of Userkare is to be found midway between those of Pepi I and Merenre Nemtyemsaf I, at a place that would make the three pyramids form a line parallel to the one formed by the pyramids of Sekhemkhet, Unas, Djoser, Userkaf and Teti to the North.

Notes

References

Bibliography

External links
 The South Saqqara Stone: Sixth Dynasty Annals

24th-century BC Pharaohs
23rd-century BC Pharaohs
Pharaohs of the Sixth Dynasty of Egypt